In the field of pharmacology, a selective receptor modulator or SRM is a type of drug that has different effects in different tissues.  A SRM may behave as an agonist in some tissues while as an antagonist in others.  Hence selective receptor modulators are sometimes referred to as tissue selective drugs or mixed agonists / antagonists. This tissue selective behavior is in contrast to many other drugs that behave either as agonists or antagonists regardless of the tissue in question.

Note that selective estrogen receptor modulator (SERM) is the only class of these drugs currently on the market in the US.

Classes 
Classes of selective receptor modulators include:

 Selective androgen receptor modulator (SARM)
 Selective estrogen receptor modulator (SERM)
 Selective progesterone receptor modulator (SPRM)

See also 
 Agonist–antagonist
 Selective glucocorticoid receptor agonist (SEGRA)

References 

Pharmacodynamics